28S ribosomal protein S33, mitochondrial is a protein that in humans is encoded by the MRPS33 gene.

Mammalian mitochondrial ribosomal proteins are encoded by nuclear genes and help in protein synthesis within the mitochondrion. Mitochondrial ribosomes (mitoribosomes) consist of a small 28S subunit and a large 39S subunit. They have an estimated 75% protein to rRNA composition compared to prokaryotic ribosomes, where this ratio is reversed. Another difference between mammalian mitoribosomes and prokaryotic ribosomes is that the latter contain a 5S rRNA. Among different species, the proteins comprising the mitoribosome differ greatly in sequence, and sometimes in biochemical properties, which prevents easy recognition by sequence homology. The 28S subunit of the mammalian mitoribosome may play a crucial and characteristic role in translation initiation. This gene encodes a 28S subunit protein that is one of the more highly conserved mitochondrial ribosomal proteins among mammals, Drosophila and Caenorhabditis elegans. Splice variants that differ in the 5' UTR have been found for this gene; all variants encode the same protein. Pseudogenes corresponding to this gene are found on chromosomes 1q, 4p, 4q, and 20q

References

Further reading

Ribosomal proteins